May Ifeoma Nwoye (née Agulue) is a Nigerian author and professor of business administration.

Early life and education 
She was born in the mid 1950s in Onitsha, Anambra State, Nigeria to Fidelis and Virginia Agulue of Umunya, Oyi Local Government area. She attended Holy Rosary Primary School, Onitsha, and did her Secondary School Education at Maria Regina Girls High School, Nnewi, Anambra State. She proceeded to the George Washington University, Washington DC, United States of America, where she obtained a degree in Accounting; she later obtained a Master's degree in Business Administration (with emphasis in Finance) from the South Eastern University, Washington DC (1980-1981). In 1997, she completed her PhD in Business Administration from the University of Benin.

Career 
Nwoye started her career as an accountant at Nutrition Inc, Washington DC before she later returned to Nigeria to participate in the National Youth Service Corps (NYSC) scheme as an accountant with the University of Benin Teaching Hospital. She was later employed by the University of Benin as a senior accountant. She also worked at the Department of Business Administration, Faculty of Management and Social Sciences, Ibrahim Badamasi Babangida University, Lapai, Niger State, Nigeria.

Her works are targeted at reducing poverty and environmental advocacy. In her 2013 fictional novel, Oil Cemetery, she writes about the struggles of a poor community trying to address the environmental and societal impacts when an oil company sets up business in their village.The novel won her the Association of Nigerian Authors/Chevron Prose Prize on Environment in 2014.

Nwoye has become a proactive influence in the crusade for women’s economic emancipation and empowerment and this in 1988 made the then First Lady of Nigeria appointed her as a member of a special committee set up to articulate programmes for the protection of women’s rights and children in Nigeria. She was the first female to be elected Vice President of the Association of Nigerian Authors (ANA) from 2001 to 2004.She is currently a Professor of Business Administration, Nile University of Nigeria.

Selected works

Creative writings
 Endless Search (1994)
 Tides of Life (1995)
 Blind Expectations (1997)
 Death by Instalments (1997)
 A Child of Destiny (2000)
 Fetters and Choices (2003)
 The Broken Promise (2008)
 Oil Cemetery (won a Chevron award in 2014)
 The Mirage (1996)
 Edible Pet (1995)

Major publications
 Small Business Enterprise, Benin Social Sciences Series for Africa
Mobilization and Management of Financial Resources in Nigerian Universities, Benin Social Sciences Series for Africa
A Focus Group Discussion Approach to the Comparative Analysis of Public and Private Sector Enterprises in Nigeria
Entrepreneurship Development and Investment Opportunities in Nigeria among others.

Professional associations 
 Fellow of Certified National Accountants (FCNA).
 Fellow of Nigerian Institute of Management.
 Fellow, Chartered Management Accountants.
 President of Intervention Council for Women in Africa (a non-governmental organisation).
 Member Board of Trustees, Centre for Population and Environmental Development (CPED).
 Board member, International Professional Women's Network, USA.
 Paul Harris Fellow of Rotary International.
 Lady of the Order of Knights of St. Mulumba.
 Member of the Association of Nigerian Authors (ANA).
 Former National Vice President, Association of Nigerian Authors.

Awards and honours
 Winner of the 2014 ANA Chevron Prize for Environmental Issues.
 Nominee for the Nigeria Prize for Literature
 The Sir Ahmadu Bello (Sardauna) Platinum Leadership Award of Excellence for her contributions to educational development of Nigeria.

Personal Life 
She is married to Gregory O. Nwoye, a professor of linguistics. They have two children.

References 

1950s births
Living people
Nigerian women academics
Nigerian business writers
Academic staff of Ibrahim Badamasi Babangida University
Nigerian expatriates in the United States
21st-century Nigerian women writers
20th-century Nigerian women writers
George Washington University alumni
Southeastern University (Washington, D.C.) alumni
University of Benin (Nigeria) alumni
People from Onitsha
Academic staff of Nile University of Nigeria